People's Republic is the thirteenth novel in the CHERUB series by Robert Muchamore. It was published by Hodder Children's Books on 4 August 2011, and shows the beginning of the Aramov series. This carries on from the series featuring long-standing central character James Adams. The series has a new central character called Ryan Sharma. Ryan is twelve years old and is just about to be sent on his first big mission to Kyrgyzstan.

Synopsis

Plot summary
People's Republic begins with introduction of Ryan Sharma. Ryan has just completed some punishment laps and finds out that he is being wanted for a mission. Also, Fu Ning, a Chinese girl lives in a Dandong boarding school and wants to escape. The book then rotates between the two characters lives, eventually showing Ryan going to the USA to infiltrate the Aramov clan through Ethan Kitsell. Ning ends up escaping China and going on the run with her stepmum Ingrid as she is wanted for questioning over her husband Chaoxiang's involvement in sending illegal immigrants across countries.

Ingrid and Ning eventually try to flee China to Britain and end up in Kyrgyzstan. Ingrid is tortured and is being tried to hand over bank account details so they can go to Britain. In the end, the deal doesn't work, leaving Ning on her own and trying to get to Britain by herself. Meanwhile, Ryan becomes Ethan's only friend after his mum and his best friend died, leaving him as his only support after saving his life again. Ryan also saved Ethan's life when he was hit by a car this helped the part of the plot to bond with him.

However, just as they were bonding, a bomb was placed at the bottom of Ethan's house leaving him and everyone else at a motel. Ethan is then taken into care by a lawyer of his mother and is about to be taken back to Kyrgyzstan. This leaves Ryan to be sent back to CHERUB campus after pushing over his mission controller, Dr D. Ryan, after being taken back to CHERUB, is punished with 500 hours of recycling duty but still has a friendship with Ethan. Amy Collins manages to reduce the amount of punishments by speaking to Zara Asker.

Ning, after being smuggled into Britain is forced to labour making sandwiches and having no way of getting out despite having no money owned to the gangsters there and not wanting to work there. She manages to escape the warehouse where she was labouring but almost gets deported back to China. But, just before the plane leaves, Amy manages to meet up with her and gets her to join CHERUB as she has a boxing champion streak required for the physique of a CHERUB agent and she is also very smart required to the mental training as well as the point where she has no parents, after all Ingrid has died being tortured and her dad is being questioned, so she is a perfect CHERUB candidate. As Ryan is involved with her story, he gives her a tour around campus and introduces her to everyone there. The book finishes off with Ryan being allowed to get back into touch with Ethan.

Main characters
 Ryan Sharma - Ryan is just about to be sent on his first big mission, with his job being to infiltrate the Aramov clan through one of the clan's daughter's son who lives in America.
 Fu Ning - Ning is seen throughout the book trying to run away from China after her adopted father is put in jail and adopted mother dies. She gets to Britain but not before being tortured by the Aramov clan. CHERUB eventually accepts her.
 Ethan Kitsell - Ethan is the son of Gillian Kitsell, one of the members of the Aramov clan. He forms a friendship with Ryan after his mom and his best friend die. Ethan is eventually taken back to Kyrgyzstan, after a lawyer of his grandmother gets him.

References

External links
 Page for People's Republic on CHERUB website
 Robert Muchamore's official website

CHERUB novels
2011 British novels
Hodder & Stoughton books